"Say Goodbye" is a song by the Dave Matthews Band, featured on the 1996 album Crash.

Song history
"Say Goodbye" evolved from the song Any Noise/Anti Noise, which debuted on July 6, 1993. The name Any Noise/Anti Noise is derived from an ambiguous lyric  in early version of the song. On September 1, 1993, Dave Matthews introduced the song as "Say Goodbye", so it is possible that Dave has always known the song by its current title instead of the fan-given title, "Any Noise/Anti Noise". Since it made its studio debut, the song has been played less often, experiencing a small bump in popularity during the 2005 tour. The band then brought the song back for the 2010 fall tour.

About this song, Dave speaks in his concert at Blue Note (Columbia, Mo - 22 October 1994): "So one time, uh, so one time, I'm stuck in a room, in a little house, and we're kinda snowed in. We got a little fire burning and there's a girl with me, who's a good friend of mine, and we're all alone, and she's got a boyfriend, and I got a girlfriend, but then one thing leads to another, and next day we're all kinda uncomfortable. *Ahem.* So that's, this song's called Say Goodbye"

Official live releases
This is a complete list of albums which have featured "Say Goodbye" as a live track.

Live at Luther College
1996 acoustic show with Dave Matthews and Tim Reynolds
Live Trax Vol. 3
Summer 2000 concert
Live Trax Vol. 4
Spring 1996 concert
Weekend on the Rocks
Summer 2005 4-night stand (the first in band history; available in 2-CD)
Live Trax Vol. 6
Summer 2006 concert at Fenway Park
The Best of What's Around Vol. 1
Live track on Disc 2 (Incorrectly labeled as a selection from Mile High Stadium on July 25, 2000, but is actually the opening number from their July 2000 show at Detroit's Comerica Park)
Live Trax Vol. 7
New Year's Eve 1996 concert
Live Trax Vol. 9
Spring 2007 concert in Las Vegas
Live Trax Vol. 17
Summer '97 Shoreline show

References

External links
DMB Almanac Listing
Guitar Tabs @ DMBTabs.com

Songs about parting
Dave Matthews Band songs
1996 songs
Songs written by Dave Matthews
Song recordings produced by Steve Lillywhite